Kaspar Munk (born June 23, 1971) is a Danish film director, writer and producer, best known as the director of HBO series Kamikaze and Danish Netflix series The Rain. Munk is the recipient of five Robert Awards, which is the Danish equivalent of the Academy Awards.

Career 
Munk made his debut in 1996 with the short film Let's Be Friends. In 2007 he was nominated for the Robert Awards for the short film Forsvunden, which went on to win the Award for Best Children's and Youth Film at Odense International Film Festival.

His first feature film was Hold Me Tight in 2010, for which he received several Danish and international awards, including the Marc'Aurelio Award in Rome, Italy, Best Feature Film Award in Tallinn, Estonia, and two awards at the festival in Mannheim-Heidelberg, Germany.

In 2012, Munk directed and co-financed You & Me Forever, which won the Danish film prize Robert Awards for Best Children's and Youth Film, as well as a nomination at the Bodil Awards. The film received the  In 2013.

In 2015, Munk moved away from youth and children movies and started directing TV series, including the DR series Ride Upon The Storm, as well as two episodes of the Netflix series The Rain.

In 2021, Munk directed the first season of the first ever Danish-produced HBO series, Kamikaze.

Filmography

TV Series

Film

Awards 

 Kamikaze (TV series) (2021)
Vildheks (Film) (2018)
(Nominated) Best Children/Youth Film, Robert Awards in 2018
(Nominated) Best Adapted Screenplay, Robert Awards in 2018
(Nominated) Michel Award, Hamburg Film Festival in 2018
 Herrens Veje (TV Series) (2018-2019)
 (Won) Best TV Series, Robert Awards in 2019
 Heartless (TV Series) (2014)
(Nominated) Best Danish TV Series, Robert Awards in 2016
Tidsrejsen (TV Series) (2014)
 (Won) Best Short-Format TV Series, Robert Awards in 2014
 You & Me Forever (Film) (2012)
 (Won) Best Children/Family Film, Robert Awards in 2012
(Nominated) Best Film, Bodil Awards in 2013
(Nominated) Best Film, Ole Awards in 2013
(Nominated) Best Feature Film for Youth, Zlín International Film Festival for Children and Youth in 2013
 Hold Me Tight (Film) (2010)
 (Won) Best Children/Family Film, Robert Awards in 2010
(Nominated) New Talent Grand PIX, CPH PIX in 2010
(Winner) Best Feature, Mannheim-Heidelberg International Filmfestival in 2010
(Winner) Audience Award, Mannheim-Heidelberg International Filmfestival in 2010
(Winner) Emerging Talent Award, Rome Film Fest in 2010
(Nominated) Best Film, Zulu Awards in 2011
Forsvunden (Short)
(Winner) Youth Jury Prize, Odense International Film Festival in 2008

References 

1971 births
Living people
Danish film directors
Danish male screenwriters
Danish film producers
People from Høje-Taastrup Municipality